Wudangshan West railway station is a railway station in Xunyang, Ankang, Shaanxi, China.

Construction on the station began in 2015. It opened on 29 November 2019.

References 

Railway stations in Shaanxi
Railway stations in China opened in 2019